Ghous Bux Brohi (Sindhi: غوث بخش بروهي) (Urdu : غوث بخش بروہی) is a Pakistani musician (flute player) from Sindh، Pakistan.

Career 
Ghous Bux Brohi is a popular bansuri (flute) player. He has been performing at several musical and cultural shows held all over the country for some time now. He performed on the occasion of lok mela, a cultural festival by Lok Virsa organization in Islamabad.

Awards
 Pride of Performance Award in 2009 by the Government of Pakistan

References

Pakistani artists
Pakistani folk music 
Sindhi people
Year of birth missing (living people)
Living people
Recipients of the Pride of Performance